Nahal Sorek Regional Council (Mo'atza Azorit Nahal Sorek) is a regional council in the Central District of Israel. The seat of the council is Yad Binyamin. The council is named for the Sorek stream.

List of communities
This regional council provides various municipal services for a few settlements within its territory:

Hafetz Haim (kibbutz)
Bnei Re'em (moshav)
Yesodot (moshav shitufi)
Netzer Hazani (moshav)
Beit Hilkia (moshav)
Yad Binyamin (community settlement)
Ganei Tal (moshav)

References

External links
Council website 

 
Regional councils in Israel